Alf Davies (1882 – 14 July 1922) was a British swimmer. He competed in the men's 200 metre breaststroke event at the 1908 Summer Olympics. On Christmas Day in 1908, Davies won the Peter Pan Cup at the Serpentine.

References

External links
 

1882 births
1922 deaths
British male swimmers
Olympic swimmers of Great Britain
Swimmers at the 1908 Summer Olympics
Place of birth missing
British male breaststroke swimmers